The Glasgow and South Western Railway (GSWR) 2 class is a class of thirteen 2-2-2 steam locomotives designed in 1857 by Patrick Stirling and intended for express passenger duties.

Development 
Patrick Stirling was appointed locomotive superintendent of the GSWR in 1853 and set about designing the new Kilmarnock Locomotive Works which was opened in 1856.  This was his first class to be built at the works (Works Nos. 1-13).
Most  members of the class had domeless boilers but some may have had domed boilers and column type safety valves above the firebox.

Withdrawal 
The class were withdrawn by James Stirling between 1874 and 1880.

References 

002
2-2-2 locomotives
Standard gauge steam locomotives of Great Britain
Scrapped locomotives